Royal Air Force West Malling or RAF West Malling is a former Royal Air Force station located  south of West Malling, Kent and  west of Maidstone, Kent, England.

Originally used as a landing area during the First World War, the site opened as a private landing ground and in 1930, then known as Kings Hill, home to the Maidstone School of Flying, before being renamed West Malling Airfield, and, in 1932, Maidstone Airport.

During the 1930s many airshows and displays were held by aviators such as Amy Johnson and Alan Cobham, flying from a grass runway.

As war approached, the airfield was taken over by the military, to become RAF West Malling in 1940, serving in the front line against the Luftwaffe. The station saw further service after the war, first with some of the RAFs first jet squadrons, and later as a US Naval Air Station.

After closure as an operational air station in the 1960s, West Malling acquired a more civilian guise, hosting several major Great Warbirds Air Displays during the 70s and 80s, until eventually closing completely as an airfield. The site is now occupied by Kings Hill, a community of mixed residential, commercial, and civic amenities, but still retains several features of its military aviation heritage.

First World War

The airfield was as a landing area during the First World War.

Second World War

RAF West Malling was not fully operational during the Battle of Britain, having suffered from several damaging bombing raids, but did play an active part in the later stages of the air campaign, becoming a premier night-fighter base.

Maidstone Airport was taken over in the prelude to the Second World War, and the RAF station was formed in June 1940, now with a concrete runway. Designated as one of two RAF Fighter Command stations assigned to C Sector, and designated as an advanced aerodrome for RAF Kenley and RAF Biggin Hill. The first aircraft arrived on 8 June 1940. These were Lysanders of No. 26 (Army Cooperation) Squadron, used for photo-reconnaissance sorties over occupied Europe. No. 51 Wing RAF arrived at the same time, and the airfield was provided with anti-aircraft and searchlight batteries for airfield defence.

Battle of Britain July 1940

On 12 July, No. 141 Squadron arrived from RAF Turnhouse, Scotland, equipped with Defiant Mk.1 turret-fighters. The squadron's first engagement with the enemy occurred a week later, when 6 out of 9 Defiants were destroyed by a superior force of Me.Bf 109s over the Channel. The three surviving aircraft were rescued only when the fight was joined by Hurricanes from No. 111 Squadron. The remainder of the unit returned north to RAF Prestwick on 25 July due to the ineffectiveness of the Defiant against single-seat fighters.

Dambuster, April 1941

No. 29 Squadron flying Bristol Beaufighters arrived for its first tour of duty on 27 April 1941. One of the Squadron's pilots, Guy Gibson VC, later officer commanding 617 Squadron on the Dambusters Raid, said of the station "Of all the airfields in Great Britain ... we have the most pleasant".

A regular and long-standing inhabitant, 29 Sqn. left for the last time on 25 November 1950.

Beaufighters 1942
In September 1942 Squadron Leader Cathcart Wight-Boycott was promoted to Acting Wing Commander and posted to RAF West Malling as Officer Commanding 29 Squadron who were still flying Bristol Beaufighters. Between December 1942 and January 1943 Wight-Boycott took the additional temporary role of Station Commander at West Malling.

German Landing, April 1943

On a misty evening on 16 April 1943 a single-engined aircraft was heard approaching the airfield by the crew of a Beaverette Mk III armoured car of 2769 Field Squadron RAF Regiment, which was on routine patrol around the airfield. The plane, a German Focke-Wulf Fw 190 fighter, circled twice then landed. The driver of the armoured car, AC Wilding immediately swung his vehicle into the path of the aircraft to prevent it from taking off again. With no means to escape, the pilot, Feldwebel Otto Bechtold, immediately gave himself up.  Driving back to the airfield from the Guardroom, they saw a second Focke-Wulf Fw 190 land, but before the armoured car could reach it, the pilot realised his mistake and turned his aircraft round to begin a take-off run.  The car commander, LAC Sharback, at once opened fire with his twin Vickers machine guns and the aircraft slewed off the runway and caught fire.  The pilot, wounded in the shoulder and leg and with his flying suit in flames, was thrown clear of the aircraft as it overturned.  The two gunners ran to the pilot's rescue, extinguished his burning clothing and dragged him clear of the aircraft. Unfortunately, when one of the Station's fire trucks was attempting to extinguish the flames, the aircraft exploded in a ball of fire, scattering debris over a radius of 300 yards and seriously injuring several of the RAF Firemen.  Within a few minutes, a third Fw 190 crashed on the approach to the runway and a fourth aircraft ploughed into a nearby orchard and burst into flames.

The serviceable aircraft was flown to Royal Aircraft Establishment at Farnborough the next day for detailed examination, and was eventually repainted in RAF livery, designated as a prototype or experimental aircraft.

The German pilots revealed that they had become lost in thick fog over the English Channel, believed they were over France, and had been directed to the airstrip by a searchlight at Detling.

Doodlebugs, 1944

From 20 June to 21 July 1944, No. 322 (Dutch) Squadron RAF, equipped with Spitfire Mk XIVs was stationed at West Malling, tasked with intercepting VI "doodlebug" flying bombs launched from the Dutch and French coasts towards London.

After the war

Night fighters, 1950s and 1960s
In use throughout the 1950s and early 1960s as Britain's premier night fighter station.

United States Navy until 1967

RAF West Malling then became home to several squadrons of the US Navy, until 1967.

Care & Maintenance

From 1967, it was placed on Care & Maintenance, used by several air-industry related businesses.

In 1964 Shorts Brothers operated out of the airfield with a contract with the RAF to service mainly Chipmunk trainers (later Bulldogs), Vickers Varsity aircraft and various other types. This contract ran at least until the late 1970's.

In March 1965, Air Cadet 618 VGS (Volunteer Gliding School) moved to West Malling from RAF Manston, setting up its headquarters in the old dispersal area near the runway threshold. Its aircraft (cable-launched Vanguard TX1 gliders) and equipment were stored into one of the large T.2 Type hangars where they remained until 1992.

From the late 1980s to the early 1990s, new build Saab 340 were sent to an aircraft finishing company established here, routing via London Southend Airport, in order to be sprayed into the colour schemes of customer airlines.

Civilian use

In September 1967, the airfield and its larger hangars were the site of filming for extended scenes in The Beatles' film Magical Mystery Tour

Following the issue by Idi Amin of Uganda 4 August 1972, of a decree ordering the expulsion of the 60,000 Asians who were not Ugandan citizens, around 30,000 of those with British passports emigrated to Britain. The unused accommodation blocks at the airfield were converted for use as temporary homes throughout 1973 until the refugees were resettled around the country. Other RAF stations involved in this exercise were RAF Honington and RAF Stradishall, both in Suffolk.

Development

RAF West Malling is now the site of Kings Hill, a mixed development of residential and business developments, including over 2,000 homes, two schools, local retail units and 18-hole golf course.

The former Officers Mess (now the Gibson Building, and used as Tonbridge and Malling Borough Council offices) was built in 1939, and is now a Grade II listed building. The Officers' Mess itself is used as the Council Chamber. A common layout was used at all RAF stations, so that visiting officers were able to find their way around easily.

The brick-built building still shows remnants of the painted camouflage pattern used during the war.

A number of H-block accommodation buildings are also in use as offices.

The control tower - also listed - is largely complete in the form it was in 1942, now surrounded by modern housing, and has been restored for use as a coffee shop.

Situated near the site of the old guard house, a memorial to the personnel stationed at RAF West Malling was unveiled on 9 June 2002. Otto Bechtold, one of the German Fw 190 pilots who had landed in error in 1943, was a guest of honour at the ceremony.

Road names in Kings Hill pay homage to the site's past use as a RAF aerodrome, with names such as Typhoon Road, Mosquito Road, Hurricane Road, Spitfire Road, Beaufighter Road, Javelin Road, Lancaster Way, Lysander Road, Meteor Road and Mustang Road, and finally Tower View running past the Control Tower.

Kings Hill Cricket Club is located on what was the main runway and the team are known as the Mosquitos. The club's pavilion bar is also known as the hangar. The club badge is the RAF roundels with a Mosquito aircraft. The junior teams are all named after other aircraft that operated out of West Malling.

Units and aircraft

The following units were here at some point:

In popular culture

Several films and TV programmes, including The Beatles' 1967 experimental film Magical Mystery Tour, the 1972 television series Pathfinders and the 1982 television drama series We'll Meet Again, used the airfield as a location during production.

Aerial sequences for an episode of the British police TV series Dempsey and Makepeace were filmed here in 1984, involving some spirited flying by a Topflite de Havilland Heron G-ANUO.

West Malling airfield served as a backdrop for the opening sequences of the 1989 "Agatha Christie's Poirot" episode "The Incredible Theft", where the T hangar formerly located behind the airfield's watch tower (today the site of the Kings Hill Asda store) was emblazoned with the name "Mayfield" and a secret prototype fighter plane, the "Mayfield Kestrel" was revealed then demonstrated by the aircraft's builder to a government minister. Filmed with the famous Spitfire IXb MH434 flown by the legendary display pilot Ray Hanna, the sequence is one of the most-memorable of the television drama's 70 broadcast episodes.

More recently, the 2007 TV series Cape Wrath includes scenes shot at Kings Hill and other local areas.

See also

 Kings Hill
 West Malling
 List of former Royal Air Force stations

References

Citations

Bibliography

External links

618 Volunteer Gliding School
Station Memorial
The Control Tower

Defunct airports in England
Royal Flying Corps airfields in Kent
Royal Air Force stations in Kent
Royal Air Force stations of World War II in the United Kingdom
Tonbridge and Malling
1917 establishments in England
1969 disestablishments in England
Airports established in 1917